The Eyeball Show (aka The 13th Anniversary Show: Live in Japan) is a live album released by American art rock group the Residents in 1986.

History 
The Residents' fair amount of success in Japan, mainly with 1984's George & James and 1985's The Big Bubble, prompted Wave Records (the group's Japanese distributor) to finance a short Japanese tour in October 1985.

Track listing

1999 CD reissue (The 13th Anniversary Show – Live in Tokyo)

References

The Residents live albums
1986 live albums